"The Liberty Song" is a pre-American Revolutionary War song with lyrics by Founding Father John Dickinson (not by Mrs. Mercy Otis Warren of Plymouth, Massachusetts). The song is set to the tunes of "Heart of Oak", the anthem of the Royal Navy of the United Kingdom. The song itself was first published in two colonial newspapers, the Pennsylvania Journal and the Pennsylvania Gazette, both on July 7, 1768.

History
The song is notable as one of the earliest patriotic songs in the Thirteen Colonies. Dickinson's sixth verse offers the earliest known publication of the phrase that parallels the motto "united we stand, divided we fall", a patriotic slogan that has prominently appeared several times throughout U.S. history.

The song is also likely to be a variant of the Irish traditional song from which it often takes its tune, "Here's a Health". The lyrics of "The Liberty Song" also hold the same structure.

The lyrics of the song were updated in 1770 to reflect the growing tensions between England and the Colonies. This new version was published in Bickerstaff's almanac, and the title was changed to "The Massachusetts Song of Liberty".

Lyrics

Original Version 

Come, join hand in hand, brave Americans all,
And rouse your bold hearts at fair Liberty's call;
No tyrannous acts shall suppress your just claim,
Or stain with dishonour America's name.

Chorus:
In Freedom we're born and in Freedom we'll live.
Our purses are ready. Steady, friends, steady;
Not as slaves, but as Freemen our money we'll give.

Our worthy forefathers, let's give them a cheer,
To climates unknown did courageously steer;
Threw' oceans to deserts for Freedom they came,
And dying, bequeath'd us their freedom and fame

Chorus

How sweet are the labours that free men endur,
that men shall enjoy the sweet profit secure.
No more sweet labors americans know,
If brittash shall reap what americans sow.

Chorus

Their generous bosoms all dangers despis'd,
So highly, so wisely, their Birthrights they priz'd;
We'll keep what they gave, we will piously keep,
Nor frustrate their toils on the land and the deep.

Chorus

The tree their own hands had to Liberty rear'd;
They lived to behold growing strong and revered;
With transport they cried, "Now our wishes we gain,
For our children shall gather the fruits of our pain."

Chorus

Swarms of placemen and pensioners soon will appear
Like locusts deforming the charms of the year;
Suns vainly will rise, showers vainly descend,
If we are to drudge for what others shall defend.

Chorus

Then join hand in hand, brave Americans all,
By uniting we stand, by dividing we fall;
In so righteous a cause let us hope to succeed,
For heaven approves of each generous deed.

Chorus

All ages shall speak with amaze and applause,
Of the courage we'll show in support of our Laws;
To die we can bear, but to serve we disdain.
For shame is to Freedom more dreadful than pain.

Chorus

This bumper I crown for our Sovereign's health,
And this for Britannia's glory and wealth;
That wealth and that glory immortal may be,
If She is but Just, and if we are but Free.

Chorus

1770 Version

Come swallow your bumpers, ye Tories, and roar,
That the sons of fair freedom are hampered once more;
But know that no cut-throats our spirits can tame,
Nor a host of oppressors shall smother the flame.

Chorus:
In Freedom we're born, and, like sons of the brave,
Will never surrender, But swear to defend her;
And scorn to survive, if unable to save.

References

The Liberty Song - 1768 link is no longer functional (September 7, 2014).

External links
 History of "The Liberty Song"
 "The Liberty Song" recording

American patriotic songs
Dickinson College
History of the Thirteen Colonies
1768 songs
Songs of the American Revolutionary War
Songs based on American history
Songs about freedom